This is a list of the current 55 African countries sorted by population, which is sorted by normalized demographic projections from the most recently available census or demographic data. Africa remains one of the world's fastest growing regions. 60% of Africa is 25 years of age or younger. Africa mainly consists of the four main regions; East Africa, West Africa, North Africa and Southern Africa.  This list also includes the partially recognized country Sahrawi Arab Democratic Republic, commonly known as Western Sahara, which is a member of the African Union.

See also 

 Demographics of Africa
 List of African countries by area
 List of African countries by life expectancy
 List of countries and dependencies by population
 List of countries by population in 2010
 List of Middle Eastern countries by population
 List of countries by past and projected future population
 List of Eurasian countries by population

References 

African
Countries, population
Demographics of Africa
Population
Lists of countries by continent